Nwosu is an Igbo name used by:
 Julius Nwosu, Nigerian basketball player
 Nwankwo Christian Nwosu Kanu, Nigerian footballer
 Uchenna Nwosu, American football player

NWOSU is also an acronym used by: 
 Northwestern Oklahoma State University

Igbo names